Events from the year 1102 in Ireland.

Incumbents
High King of Ireland: Domnall Ua Lochlainn

Events
Arnulf de Montgomery, Lord of Pembroke, being banished from England and Wales for joining with his brother in rebellion against Henry I of England, serves his father-in-law, Muirchertach Ua Briain, High King of Ireland; Henry imposes a trade embargo against Ireland.
Betrothal of Muirchertach Ua Briain's daughters: Lafracoth to Arnulf de Montgomery and Bjaðmunjo to Sigurd (son of Magnus Barefoot).
Archbishop Anselm of Canterbury writes to Muirchertach Ua Briain urging ecclesiastical reform and restoring good relations between him and Henry I of England.
Domnall Ua Conchobair becomes King of Connacht

Births
Gilla na Naemh Ua Duinn, poet, historian and cleric (died 1160).
Approximate date and probable location – Harald IV Gille of Norway (killed 1136).

Deaths
Mugrón Ua Morgair, archlector of Armagh.
Domnall Ua Ruairc, King of Connacht and Breifne.

References

 
Years of the 12th century in Ireland
Ireland
1100s in Ireland